The cactus canastero (Pseudasthenes cactorum) is a species of bird in the family Furnariidae.  It is endemic to Peru.  Its natural habitat is subtropical or tropical high-altitude shrubland.

References

cactus canastero
Birds of the Peruvian Andes
Endemic birds of Peru
cactus canastero
Taxonomy articles created by Polbot